The Saxon Shield is a breed of fancy pigeon. Saxon Shields, along with other varieties of domesticated pigeons, are all descendants from the rock pigeon (Columba livia).

Appearance 
The Saxon Shield comes in many colors including black, blue, red and yellow with white bars or spangles, blue with black bars or barless, blue check or silver check.

Origin 
The Saxon Shield originated in Saxony.

See also 
List of pigeon breeds
Saxon Spot
Saxon Monk

External links
Saxon Shield Standard http://www.azpigeonclub.org/bird_standards/saxon_shield.htm

Pigeon breeds
Pigeon breeds originating in Germany